Cedar Lawn Cemetery, also known as Cedarlawn Cemetery, was created in 1899, becoming the second official public cemetery for the city of Jackson, Mississippi.

Notable interments
 Julian P. Alexander (1887–1953), associate justice Supreme Court of Mississippi (1941–53).
 Waldo Emerson Bailey (1896–1961), American Consul.
 Theodore DuBose Bratton (1862–1944), served as Bishop of Mississippi in The Episcopal Church from 1903 until 1938.
 Myra Hamilton Green (1924–2002), Mississippi artist who specialized in portraits and still life.
 Andrew Houston Longino (1854–1942), 35th Governor of Mississippi, in office 1900–04.
 Dunbar Rowland (1864–1937), historian and archivist who served as Director of Mississippi Department of Archives and History for 35 years.

Flying Dutchmen

In the early years of World War II, Nazi Germany occupied the Netherlands.  Between 1942 and 1944, the United States permitted 500 displaced Dutch aviators to train at Jackson Army Airbase, which became known as the Royal Netherlands Military Flying School.  During those years, more than two dozen Dutchmen were killed in local training accidents.  In recognition of their service, the City of Jackson donated a plot of ground within Cedar Lawn Cemetery to the Netherlands for burial of their dead.

See also
 Begraafplaats Cedar Lawn
 National Register of Historic Places listings in Hinds County, Mississippi

References

External links
 
 Mississippi Department of Archives and HistoryA Sense of Place (Aviation in Mississippi: Jackson's Flying Dutchmen) Retrieved 2015-07-15.

Cemeteries in Mississippi
Protected areas of Hinds County, Mississippi